Farmers Creek Township is a township in Jackson County, Iowa, USA.

History
Farmers Creek Township was established in 1840.

References

Townships in Jackson County, Iowa
Townships in Iowa
1840 establishments in Iowa Territory
Populated places established in 1840